Hisingsbacka FC is a Swedish football club located in Backa in Hisingen, Gothenburg.

Background
Hisingsbacka FC is a football club which was founded in 2005.

Since their foundation Hisingsbacka FC has participated mainly in the middle and lower divisions of the Swedish football league system.  The club currently plays in Division 3 Mellersta Götaland which is the fifth tier of Swedish football. They play their home matches at the Backavallen in Backa, Gothenburg.

Hisingsbacka FC are affiliated to Göteborgs Fotbollförbund.

Notable players
Bengt Berndtsson
Carlos Strandberg
Kristopher Da Graca
Fredrik Zanjanchi
Ole Söderberg
Tom Söderberg
Emil Wahlström
David Frölund
Dennis Jonsson

Season to season
In recent seasons Hisingsbacka FC have competed in the following divisions:

External links
 Hisingsbacka FC – Official website
 Hisingsbacka FC on Facebook

Footnotes

Football clubs in Gothenburg
Association football clubs established in 2005
2005 establishments in Sweden
Football clubs in Västra Götaland County